Garland Scott and Toler Moore Tucker House is a historic home located in the Oakwood neighborhood of Raleigh, North Carolina.  It is located in the Oakwood Historic District. The house was built in 1914, and is a two-story, Southern Colonial Revival style frame dwelling with rear wings and porches.  It has a brick foundation, weatherboard siding, and a slate-covered hipped roof.  The front facade features a monumental rounded double-height porch, with four enormous fluted Ionic order columns.  It was moved from its original located at 420 North Blount Street to 418 North Person Street, in 1974.

It was listed on the National Register of Historic Places in 2014.

References 

Houses on the National Register of Historic Places in North Carolina
Colonial Revival architecture in North Carolina
Houses completed in 1914
Houses in Raleigh, North Carolina
National Register of Historic Places in Raleigh, North Carolina